Fernando Rodríguez Doval (born 29 April 1980) is a Mexican politician affiliated with the PAN. As of 2013 he served as Deputy of the LXII Legislature of the Mexican Congress representing the Federal District.

References

1980 births
Living people
People from Mexico City
National Action Party (Mexico) politicians
University of Salamanca alumni
21st-century Mexican politicians
Deputies of the LXII Legislature of Mexico
Members of the Chamber of Deputies (Mexico) for Mexico City